Nostalgia for Infinity is the debut studio album by Sound of Ceres. It was released on 4 March 2016 by Joyful Noise Recordings. The album title is derived from the name of a starship in the Revelation Space series by Alastair Reynolds.

Track listing

Reception
In his review for AllMusic, Tim Sendra wrote: "Nostalgia for Infinity is dream pop at its finest and Sound of Ceres have made the kind of debut album that should earn love and respect from all corners of the indie rock world"

References

2016 debut albums
Sound of Ceres albums
Joyful Noise Recordings albums